The Kansas City crime family, also known as the Civella crime family or Kansas City Mafia, is an Italian-American Mafia family based in Kansas City, Missouri.

History

Early history
The Italian-American organized crime family began when two Sicilian mafiosi known as the DiGiovanni brothers fled Sicily to Kansas City, Missouri, in 1912. Joseph "Joe Church" DiGiovanni  and Peter "Sugarhouse Pete" DiGiovanni began making money from a variety of criminal operations or rackets shortly after their arrival.

Their fortunes greatly improved with the introduction of Prohibition, when they became the only group bootlegging alcohol in Kansas City. Their rackets at this time were controlled by John Lazia, who later became the leading figure when the organisation expanded. The gang was given virtually a free hand to operate by their boss Tom Pendergast, head of the Pendergast Machine that controlled Kansas City's government at the time. Under Pendergast, Kansas City became a wide-open town, with absolutely no alcohol-related arrests being made within city limits during the entirety of Prohibition. The DiGiovanni family directly benefited from this lack of enforcement of prohibition laws.

Post-Prohibition
When Prohibition ended in 1933, the family, although already involved in various rackets, allegedly began extorting bars. On July 10, 1934, Lazia was assassinated, probably on the orders of his underboss, Charles Carrollo, who ruled as boss until his arrest in 1939 for tax evasion. His underboss Charles Binaggio then became the new boss and expanded the family's areas of labor into racketeering. With the help of Binaggio, Forrest Smith was elected in the Missouri gubernatorial race of 1948, and he took office on January 10, 1949. Binaggio was seen as a liability to the Mafia's nationwide commission, and it was decided that Binaggio should be killed. He was assassinated on April 6, 1950, and his successor Anthony Gizzo died of a heart attack in 1953.

Nicholas Civella
The new boss was now Nicholas Civella, who greatly expanded the family's rackets and forged alliances with families from other cities, making the organization very powerful. Civella used the Teamsters to fund casinos in Las Vegas. In 1975, Civella was imprisoned on gambling charges for betting on the 1970 Super Bowl, played between the Minnesota Vikings and the Kansas City Chiefs. Around this time, there was a war in the family over control of the River Quay entertainment district, in which three buildings were bombed and several gangsters were killed.

Operation Strawman

The Kansas City FBI, suspecting mob involvement at the Tropicana Casino in Las Vegas, set up a broad investigation, known as Operation Strawman, which involved wiretapping phones of reputed mobsters and their associates in Kansas City. From the evidence collected by taps and other eavesdropping in the late 1970s, the FBI discovered a conspiracy to skim money from the Tropicana Casino.

Operation Strawman learned that Joe Agosto, head of the Tropicana's Folies Bergere show, controlled the skimming in the Tropicana. Agosto was secretly sending cash from the casino to Kansas City organized-crime chief Nick Civella and Joseph Aiuppa of Chicago, as well as Cleveland and Milwaukee mobsters.

In 1981, a grand jury in Kansas City indicted Agosto, Kansas City mob boss Nick Civella, Civella's brother Carl Civella, mob member Carl DeLuna, and Carl Thomas, who had directed the illegal skimming of cash at the Tropicana with two others. The defendants were convicted in 1983.

In January 1992, Moretina pleaded guilty to a federal money laundering charge and was sentenced to 37 months. Moretina served as president of a firm that distributed illegal video gambling machines. He and his business partner, purported mob underboss Peter J. Simone, operated the Be Amused Vending and Amusement Co. Moretina is the son of Charles Moretina, who was convicted in the 1980s for skimming Las Vegas casino gambling receipts.

21st century
William "Willie the Rat" Cammisano, Sr., became the family's next boss until his death in 1995. Anthony Civella then became the new boss. He died in 2006.

The Kansas City family had an estimated 25 made members as of the late 1990s, according to the FBI.

The current boss of the family is believed to be John Joseph Sciortino, also known as "Johnny Joe", godson of Anthony Civella. The current underboss is believed to be Peter Simone.

On July 21, 2008, Carl "Tuffy" DeLuna, former underboss to Nick Civella and brother-in-law to Anthony Civella, died.

On March 11, 2010, the FBI indicted Gerlarmo "Jerry" Cammisano, James Moretina, Michael Lombardo, and James DiCapo for allegedly operating a "multi-million-dollar internet gambling scheme". Jerry Cammisano, son of William "Willie the Rat" Cammisano, served as the "master agent" of the sports bookmaking operation, which was based in the Kansas City area. Jerry's brother, William D. Cammisano, Jr., pleaded guilty for his role in the sports bookmaking operation.

Prior to the indictment, six individuals pleaded guilty in connection with the investigation, including three – Vincent Civella and brothers Michael and Anthony Sansone – who are the son and grandsons of former Kansas City boss Anthony "Tony Ripe" Civella. According to Scott Burnstein's Gangster Report, the Kansas City mob is on its last legs with 12 made men or less. The family still has some gambling and loansharking with some extortion involving drugs and the strip club industry.

Historical leadership

Bosses
1912–1931 – Joseph "Joe Church" DiGiovanni
1931–1934 – John "Brother John" Lazia (murdered in 1934)
1934–1939 – Charles "Charlie the Wop" Carrollo (convicted in 1939)
1939–1950 – Charles Binaggio  (murdered in 1950)
1950–1953 – Anthony Gizzo 
1953–1983 – Nicholas Civella (convicted in 1977 and 1980; deceased in 1983)
Acting 1977–1979 – Carl "Tuffy" DeLuna (imprisoned in 1979)
Acting 1979–1983 – Carl "Cork" Civella (became official boss)
1983–1984 – Carl "Cork" Civella (convicted in 1984)
1984–1995 – William "Willie the Rat" Cammisano
1995–2006 – Anthony "Tony Ripe" Civella (arrested in 1992)
Acting 1995–2006 – John "Johnny Joe" Sciortino
2006–present John “Johnny Joe” Sciortino

Current family members

Administration
 Boss – John "Johnny Joe" Sciortino – current boss of the family; Sciortino was formerly a capo and the godson and protégé of boss Anthony Civella. He was named acting boss by Civella after he was imprisoned in 1995, and became the official boss after his death in 2006. Sciortino is suspected of being involved in the murder of family associate Larry Strada, who was shot to death in the driveway of his home on May 16, 1990. FBI agents testified that the two mobsters charged in the case, John Mandacina and Patrick McGuire, were seen meeting with Sciortino and Peter Simone at Simone's Social Avenue Club in the hours before Strada's murder.
 Underboss – Peter "Las Vegas Pete" Simone – longtime family member.
 Consigliere – Frank DeLuna – the FBI in Missouri believes he is the aide to Sciortino.

Soldiers 

 Vincent Civella – son of former boss "Tony Ripe" Civella. In 2010, Civella pleaded guilty to conducting an illegal gambling operation that utilized a computer system based in Costa Rica. He was also ordered to forfeit $40,000 to the federal government. He was released from prison on September 23, 2011.
 James Moretina – In 2010, Moretina pleaded guilty to conducting an illegal gambling business alongside Vincent Civella. He was released from prison on April 27, 2012.
 Vincent Pisciotta – A career criminal, Pisciotta was charged with second-degree murder in 1980 for a 1978 killing, but a mistrial was declared when a key witness vanished. The witness later reappeared and claimed that he was beaten out of testifying. In 1988, he was indicted for another murder, but charges were reduced to manslaughter and he served 120 days in jail. In 2013, Pisciotta was convicted of arson in an incident where he helped burn down a restaurant for insurance money. He has a projected release date of December 9, 2029.
 Peter J. "PJ" Ribaste – Kansas City soldier, Ribaste has been excluded from gambling in the state of Nevada.
 Randy "Junior B" Badolato - St. Louis soldier, street capo and grandson of capo Ralph "Bottles" Badolato with alleged ties to Kansas City.

Past members 

 William "Little Willie" Cammisano Jr. – captain and son of former Kansas City mob boss William "Willie the Rat" Cammisano Sr. His first conviction was in 1989 for obstruction of justice after he intimidated a witness involved in a murder trial; he was released three years later. He has been the suspect of numerous gangland executions during the 1980s. Cammisano is also blacklisted from every casino in Kansas City and Las Vegas. In 2010, he pleaded guilty to running a massive illegal gambling operation which amounted to $3.5 million over the course of three years; he received one year. Cammisano died of COVID-19 on January 17, 2023.

In media
In August 2008, retired FBI agent William Ouseley published his history of the KC crime family from 1900 to 1950 in a book titled Open City.

On March 20, 2009, Blackhand Strawman, a documentary of Kansas City's organized crime history, was released in theaters in Kansas City.

On March 1, 2011 retired FBI agent William Ouseley published his history of the KC crime family from 1950 to 2000 in a book titled Mobsters in Our Midst.

On November 25, 2013, the documentary film Gangland Wire was released. This film uses audio clips from FBI wiretaps to tell the story of how law enforcement uncovered a massive conspiracy to control Las Vegas casinos.

See also
Anthony J. Biase, operated in Omaha, Nebraska

References

Sources
AmericanMafia.com - 26 Mafia cities - Kansas City
Crime Magazine - The History of the Kansas City Family

 
Organizations established in 1912
1912 establishments in Missouri
Italian-American crime families
Gangs in Missouri
Gangs in Nebraska
Gangs in Nevada
Gangs in Oklahoma
Crime in Kansas City, Missouri
Italian-American culture in Missouri